Dominique de Caen ( – ) was a mathematician, Doctor of Mathematics, and professor of Mathematics, who specialized in graph theory, probability, and information theory. He is renowned for his research on Turán's extremal problem for hypergraphs.

Career

He studied mathematics at McGill University, where he earned a Bachelor of Science degree in 1977.

In 1979, he obtained a Master of Science degree from Queen's University with a thesis on Prime Boolean matrices.

In 1982, he earned the Doctorate of Mathematics degree from University of Toronto with a thesis entitled On Turán's Hypergraph Problem which was supervised by Eric Mendelsohn.

Most of his academic papers have been published in the journals Discrete Mathematics, Designs, Codes and Cryptography, the Journal of Combinatorial Theory, and the European Journal of Combinatorics, among others.

Academic research

References

20th-century Canadian mathematicians
1956 births
2002 deaths
21st-century Canadian mathematicians
McGill University Faculty of Science alumni
Queen's University at Kingston alumni
University of Toronto alumni